"(Tell Me) She Means Nothing to You At All" is a 1988 single by American singer La Toya Jackson. Released in 1988, it was one of three songs Jackson recorded with British hitmaking producers Stock Aitken & Waterman. The song was co-written by Jackson and Stock Aitken & Waterman.

Background
Tell Me was originally released as the b-side to her single "(Ain't Nobody Loves You) Like I Do". It was later released as a standalone single in France in early 1988, where it failed to chart. Both songs were later included on her fifth album, La Toya, released several months afterwards, in October 1988. The Miami News described the song as being a "pop gem" that displays "Jackson at her best."

The song's title has a typographical error. It was issued with the title "(Tell Me) He Means Nothing to You At All", but Jackson is clearly singing SHE on the song. This error was never corrected neither on the single, nor the "(Ain't Nobody Loves You) Like I Do" single, nor the La Toya album.

References

1988 singles
La Toya Jackson songs
Songs written by Mike Stock (musician)
Songs written by Matt Aitken
Songs written by Pete Waterman
1988 songs
RCA Records singles
Song recordings produced by Stock Aitken Waterman
Songs written by La Toya Jackson